Millevaches is a commune in the Corrèze department in central France in the Nouvelle-Aquitaine region.

Geography

Location
The commune located in the Massif Central, part of the Regional Natural Park of the Millevaches in Limousin. The village of Millevaches is distinguished by at least two characteristics. The first is that it is the highest commune of the whole Limousin, perched between 890 and 920 meters above sea level. The second is that it is located on the dividing watershed between the tributaries of the Loire and those of the Dordogne. To the north, it is Vienne which takes its source about 4 km from the village, to the south, the Vézère, the Luzège and the Triouzoune are just three to five kilometres away.

Toponymy
The commune, yet among the least populated of the area in question, gave its name to the plateau of Millevaches.

Population

History

In 1048, the Viscount of Aubusson ceded the locality of Millevaches to the Abbey of Uzerche. The village is mentioned in the cartulary of this abbey in 1145 and 1146 in the latinised form Millevacas.

See also
Communes of the Corrèze department

References

Communes of Corrèze